Evidence of Inequity is an EP by Canadian death metal band Beneath the Massacre. It was released on May 31, 2005, through Galy Records. This EP was recorded and mixed at Victor Studio by Yannick St-Amand and mastered by Alan Douches at West West Side Studio in 2005. The lyrics of the album deal with subjects such as politics and social inequality.

Track listing

Personnel
Elliot Desgagnés – vocals
Christopher Bradley – guitar
Dennis Bradley – bass
Justin Rousselle – drums
Christian Pépin – guitar

References 

2005 EPs
Beneath the Massacre albums